A to B may refer to:

 A to B (EP), or the title song, by Matt Hires, 2010
 "A to B", a song by The Futureheads from The Futureheads

See also
 "A to the B", a song by Infernal
 (A→B) Life, an album by mewithoutYou
 A2B (disambiguation)